Jerada (Arabic: جرادة, Berber: Ijṛaden) is a province in the Oriental Region of Morocco. Its population in 2004 was 105,840.

The major cities and towns are:
 Ain Bni Mathar
 Jerada
 Oued Heimer
 Sidi Boubker
 Touissit

Subdivisions
The province is divided administratively into the following:

References

 
Jerada